Hasaranga is a Sri Lankan surname. Notable people with the surname include:

 Buddika Hasaranga (born 1985), Sri Lankan cricketer
 Wanindu Hasaranga (born 1997), Sri Lankan cricketer

Sinhalese surnames
Sinhalese masculine given names